Welcome To New York is a 2018 Indian Hindi-language 3D comedy film, directed by Chakri Toleti, produced by Vashu Bhagnani and Jackky Bhagnani, and starring Diljit Dosanjh, Sonakshi Sinha, Karan Johar, Ritesh Deshmukh, Boman Irani, Lara Dutta, Sushant Singh Rajput and Rana Daggubati. The film released on 23 February 2018.

Plot
Teji (Diljit Dosanjh), a sloppy recovery agent who dreams of being an actor, and Jeenal Patel (Sonakshi Sinha), a fashion designer, become part of a big Bollywood event (IIFA) in New York. In between Karan Johar gets kidnapped but it is revealed that he is not Karan but Arjun.

Cast

Main cast
Diljit Dosanjh as Teji
Sonakshi Sinha as Jeenal Patel
Karan Johar as himself/Arjun
Lara Dutta as Sophie
Boman Irani as Mr. Garry
Ritesh Deshmukh as himself 
 Rajendra Shastri as Jeenal Patel's Grandfather
 Sammy Jonas Heaney as Johnathon (Bollywood debut)

Cameo Appearances
 Preity Zinta
 Rani Mukerji
 Sushant Singh Rajput
 Rana Daggubati
 Salman Khan
 Saif Ali Khan
 Katrina Kaif
 Varun Dhawan
 Tiger Shroff
 Aditya Roy Kapur 
 Disha Patani 
 Neha Dhupia  
 Taapsee Pannu 
 Shahid Kapoor    
 Mohit Sinha 
 Alia Bhatt
 Arjun Kapoor
 Sonu Sood
 Arbaaz Khan
 Sohail Khan
 Kriti Sanon
 Bipasha Basu
 Priyanka Chopra

Soundtrack

The music of the film is composed by Sajid–Wajid, Shamir Tandon and Meet Bros while lyrics have been penned by Kausar Munir, Kumaar, Charanjeet Charan, Sajid Khan and Danish Sabri.

Reception

Critical response

Rajeev Masand of News 18 severely criticized the film saying that, "Welcome to New York isn't merely a bad film, or even a terrible one. It's depressing. Not because the plot is all over the place (it is!), not because the actors appear to be doing whatever they like (they are!), and not because it has no vision or ambition (it doesn't!) – but because it's an exercise in sheer pointlessness. Really, this film has no reason to exist." and gave it a rating of 1 out of 5. Rohit Vats of Hindustan Times gave the film a rating of 0.5 out of 5 and concluded his review by saying that, "Welcome To New York is totally lost in New York, and looks nothing more than an extended IIFA trailer. It's not worth wasting your time, money, patience and intelligence on this mind-numbing promotional video.". Shubhra Gupta of The Indian Express gave the film a rating of 1 out of 5 and said that, "Welcome To New York turns out to be a limp, lame tribute to Bollywood".

References

External links
 
 

Indian comedy films
Films scored by Sajid–Wajid
Films shot in New York City
Films scored by Shamir Tandon
Films scored by Meet Bros Anjjan
Films directed by Chakri Toleti
2018 comedy films
2010s Hindi-language films
Hindi-language comedy films
Indian films set in New York City